Călimănel may refer to the following places in Romania:

Călimănel, a village in the municipality of Toplița, Harghita County
Călimănel (Mureș), a tributary of the river Mureș in Harghita County
Călimănel (Neagra), a tributary of the river Neagra in Suceava County